Frederick William II  may refer to:

 Frederick William II, Duke of Saxe-Altenburg (1603–1669)
 Frederick William II, Duke of Schleswig-Holstein-Sonderburg-Beck (1687–1749)
 Frederick William II, Prince of Nassau-Siegen (1706–1734)
 Frederick William II of Prussia (1744–1797), King of Prussia from 1786